The internal market is the single market that exists amongst the member states of the European Union 

Internal market may also refer to:

 NHS internal market, the structure of healthcare supply in England's National Health Service
 Single market or common market, an association of countries which have removed trade barriers to form continuous market
 United Kingdom Internal Market Act 2020, is an act of the Parliament to update trading laws within the U.K.

See also
 Common market (disambiguation)